Like a Melody, No Bitterness is the sixth studio album by Bob Ostertag, released on October 13, 1998 by Seeland Records.

Music
The album comprises a single piece of music created by a Ensoniq ASR-10 sampler that slowly builds throughout from quiet abstract atmospherics into a distortion informed counterpoints. The music represented a continuation of Ostertag expanding his art through mixing samples of human voices and chanting crowd noises with purely electronic soundscapes and collaborating with improvisational musical acts such as Fred Frith and John Zorn. It was released to commemorate Ostertag's final improvisations using a sampler, which he had used to create music for over ten years, before switching to compose on a laptop computer.

Reception

François Couture of AllMusic gave the album two and a half out of five possible stars, saying "although Ostertag shows some nice invention and definite mastery of his art, the piece lacks direction." A critic for Cadence gave it a positive review and called it "a long piece that grows and morphs itself from quiet clicks and rumblings into a complex web of shimmering intensity."

Track listing

Personnel
Adapted from the Like a Melody, No Bitterness liner notes.

Musicians
 Bob Ostertag – Ensoniq ASR-10 sampler

Additional musicians
 Fred Frith – guitar
 John Zorn – saxophone

Production and design
 Heide Foley – cover art, design

Release history

References

External links 
 Like a Melody, No Bitterness at Bandcamp
 

1998 albums
Bob Ostertag albums
Seeland Records albums